Manon Jutras (born 25 November 1967) is a road cyclist from Canada. She represented her nation at the 2004 Summer Olympics. She also rode at the 2003 and 2004 UCI Road World Championships.

References

External links
 profile at Procyclingstats.com

1967 births
Canadian female cyclists
Living people
Place of birth missing (living people)
Cyclists at the 2004 Summer Olympics
Olympic cyclists of Canada
20th-century Canadian women
21st-century Canadian women